Damon Jones  (born 17 March 1993) is a British professional boxer who has challenged once for the British middleweight title.

Amateur career
Jones won the 2011 Amateur Boxing Association British welterweight title, when boxing out of the West Leeds ABC.

Professional career
Jones made his professional debut on 10 March 2012, winning a round-round points decision against Liam Griffiths. On 25 July 2015, Jones fought for his first major regional championship—the British middleweight title—but was stopped in six rounds by defending champion Nick Blackwell.

Professional record

References

External links

Middleweight boxers
English male boxers
1993 births
Living people
Sportspeople from Leeds
Southpaw boxers